Tanya Frei (born 31 May 1972) is a Swiss curler and Olympic medalist. She received a silver medal at the 2002 Winter Olympics in Salt Lake City.

References

External links
 

1972 births
Living people
Swiss female curlers
Olympic curlers of Switzerland
Curlers at the 2002 Winter Olympics
Olympic silver medalists for Switzerland
Olympic medalists in curling
Medalists at the 2002 Winter Olympics
Continental Cup of Curling participants
Swiss curling champions
21st-century Swiss women